Two Lochs Radio is Britain's smallest commercial radio station. It broadcasts a music-led service to the communities of Gairloch, Loch Ewe and Loch Maree areas of Wester Ross, in the Highlands of Scotland. It is the only commercial FM radio station in Wester Ross.

The station broadcasts in stereo on 106.0 and 106.6MHz FM. It also provides the Lochbroom FM service for the Ullapool and Coigach areas on 96.8 and 102.2MHz FM.

For about 60 hours per week the station broadcasts locally-originated shows from its own presenters and partner stations, with the remaining airtime offering Smooth Scotland as an alternative to the BBC-only services otherwise available on FM in the area.

The station is owned by the community and operates on a not-for-profit basis.

Unusually, Two Lochs Radio also provides a telephone listening service by an ordinary phone call to 0330 998 1114 (UK) or 518 500 1063 (US). This service is limited to telephone audio quality, but doesn't require FM reception or an Internet connection.

History
In April 2008, Two Lochs Radio launched an online "Listen live" streaming service, accessible from a button on its homepage, and also in the Reciva database for Internet radios. In January 2012, Two Lochs Radio joined the large number of UK commercial and BBC stations also available via Radioplayer. It is also available via TuneIn.

Programming
Two Lochs Radio's programme schedule includes daily breakfast and afternoon shows, plus a range of individual music and local interest programmes, including Gaelic broadcasts and recordings from local events. The station also broadcasts Gaelic programmes produced by CKJM-FM in Cape Breton, and shows from several other independent Scottish radio presenters.

Awards
Two Lochs Radio was given the "Calor Scottish Business in the Community Business" award in 2004 and is a three-times winner of the Wallace Sword award for the best Gaelic magazine programme produced by a Highland community radio station. It was also nominated for the Scottish Countryside Alliance rural enterprise award in 2009.

References

External links
 

Radio stations in Scotland
Mass media in Highland (council area)
Radio stations in the Highlands & Islands
Gairloch